Jørlunde is a village with a population of 299 (1 January 2022) in North Zealand in Denmark.

In the late Viking age and early medieval age, Jørlunde was the center of the Hvide clan. Jørlunde Church (Joerlunde  Kirke) was erected by Skjalm Hvide around the year 1100.

References

External links
Jørlunde Church website

Villages in Denmark